Lynn Rapaport is an American sociologist and Holocaust scholar. She is the Henry Snyder Professor of Sociology at Pomona College in Claremont, California.

References

External links
Faculty page at Pomona College

Year of birth missing (living people)
Living people
Pomona College faculty
American sociologists
American women sociologists
Historians of the Holocaust
University of Southern California alumni
Columbia University alumni